Born Late is the second studio album released by pop singer, Shaun Cassidy.  The album was released in 1977 following the success of Cassidy's self-titled debut album.

The album yielded two hit singles. The first, "Hey Deanie", was written by Eric Carmen, who also wrote the song "That's Rock 'n' Roll" (which was a hit from Cassidy's first solo album).  "Hey Deanie" reached #7 in early 1978.  For the second single, also following the formula of his first album, Cassidy remade a 1960s hit, in this case The Lovin' Spoonful's "Do You Believe in Magic?" (which was written by John Sebastian). That single became a modest hit, peaking at #31 on the US Billboard Hot 100.

Born Late was certified platinum.
Unlike his first album, Cassidy wrote or co-wrote half of the songs.  The track "It's Up To You"  was co-written with Cassidy by Lost In Space child-star Billy Mumy.

"Carolina's Comin' Home" is a cover of White Plains.

Track listing
 "Teen Dream" (Shaun Cassidy)
 "Do You Believe in Magic" (John Sebastian)
 "Baby, Baby, Baby" (Jay Gruska, D. Leineke)
 "It's Up to You" (Shaun Cassidy, David Joliffe, Bill Mumy)
 "Audrey" (Shaun Cassidy, David Joliffe)
 "Hey Deanie" (Eric Carmen)
 "A Girl Like You" (Felix Cavaliere, Eddie Brigati)
 "Walk Away" (Shaun Cassidy)
 "Carolina's Comin' Home" (Roger Cook, Roger Greenaway, John Goodison, Tony Hiller)
 "Strange Sensation" (Shaun Cassidy)

Charts

Weekly charts

Year-end charts

References

Shaun Cassidy albums
1977 albums
Warner Records albums
Albums produced by Michael Lloyd (music producer)